Gazella psolea is an unusual prehistoric species of gazelle that lived in Africa and Arabia; it is only known from fossils. It makes up the subgenus Deprezia due to its unique skull morphology: it had a long premolar row, and its nasal area is peculiar, with short nasal bones and a very large nasal opening. It therefore seems to have been able to breathe cold and dry air (a similar adaptation as found in the saiga), but why this feature evolved is still rather mysterious. Perhaps it made seasonal migrations to the High Atlas mountains, where such an adaptation would have been useful.

The species lived during the Late Pliocene (some 2.5 mya); its remains have been found at Ahl al Oughlam near Casablanca, Morocco.

References
 Geraads, Denis & Amani, Fethi (1998): Bovidae (Mammalia) du Pliocène final d'Ahl al Oughlam, Casablanca, Maroc. Paläontologische Zeitschrift 72(1-2): 191–205. PDF fulltext [French with English and German abstracts]

External links
 CRP d'Ivry: Site of Denis Geraads with specimen pictures and information. Retrieved 2007-APR-13.

Gazella
Pliocene mammals of Africa
Prehistoric bovids
Mammals of North Africa
Mammals of the Middle East
Fossil taxa described in 1998